Oh "Christopher" Chwee Hock (date of birth unknown, died 1996) was a Singaporean water polo player. He competed in the men's tournament at the 1956 Summer Olympics.

References

External links
 
 

Year of birth missing
1996 deaths
Singaporean male water polo players
Olympic water polo players of Singapore
Water polo players at the 1956 Summer Olympics
Place of birth missing
Asian Games medalists in water polo
Asian Games gold medalists for Singapore
Water polo players at the 1954 Asian Games
Medalists at the 1954 Asian Games
20th-century Singaporean people